Jacob ben Joseph Reischer (Bechofen) (1661–1733) was an Austrian rabbi and halakhist.

Biography
Jacob Reischer was born in Prague. He was the son of Rabbi Joseph Reischer, author of Giv'ot 'Olam, and a pupil of R. Simon Spira of Prague. Reischer married Spira's granddaughter, the daughter of his son Benjamin Wolf.

Rabbinic career
Reischer was dayyan at Prague, whence he was called to the rabbinate of Rzeszów in Galicia, deriving his name Reischer from that city, which is known as Reische among the Jews. He was subsequently called to the rabbinate of Ansbach, and then occupied a similar position at Worms, from 1713 to 1719, when he went to Metz, officiating there until his death in February 1733.  He is buried in the Jewish cemetery in Metz.

Published works
 Minḥat Ya'aḳov (Prague, 1689 et seq.), commentary on the Torat ha-Ḥaṭṭat of Moses Isserles, with many refutations and amplifications
 Torat ha-Shelamim, commentary on the Yoreh De'ah, Hilkot "Niddah", and on the Ḳonṭres ha-Sefeḳot of Shabbethai ha-Kohen, with an appendix containing eighteen responsa on various subjects (printed as the second part of the Minḥat Ya'aḳob, ib. 1689 et seq.)
 Ḥoḳ Ya'aḳov, commentary on Oraḥ Ḥayyim, Hilkot "Pesaḥ", first printed with the Shulhan Aruk, Oraḥ Ḥayyim (Dessau, 1696)
 Solet le-Minḥah, supplements to the Minḥat Ya'aḳov and the Torat ha-Shelamim, first printed with the Ḥoḳ Ya'aḳov (ib. 1696)
 Iyyun Ya'aḳov (Wilmersdorf, 1729), commentary on the En Ya'aḳov
 Shevut Ya'aḳov, responsa and decisions in three parts
 (Halle, 1709), with the appendix Pe'er Ya'aḳov, containing novellæ on the treatises Berakot, Baba Ḳamma, and Giṭṭin
 (Offenbach, 1719), treatises on the rules miggo and sefeḳ sefeḳa
 (Metz, 1789), containing also his Lo Hibbiṭ Awen be-Ya'aḳob, a reply to the attacks of contemporary rabbis upon his Minḥat Ya'aḳob and Torat ha-Shelamim

References

The life and works of Rabbi Jacob Reischer.
Author: Rabbi Rudolph J Adler
Thesis, Dissertation, 1960
[New York, NY] : Yeshiva University, 1960
Abstract"In the following pages an endeavor will be made to write a biography of Jacob Reischer based upon his works and many writings of his contemporaries. Correspondence with official record keepers and historians from the cities in which our rabbi flourished has helped to make this account more complete."

Further reading
 Its bibliography:
Eliakim Carmoly, in Jost's Annalen, 1840, p. 96;
Julius Fürst, Bibl. Jud. iii. 148-149:
Azulai, Shem ha-Gedolim, s.v. Jacob Back;
Steinschneider, Cat. Bodl. cols. 1248–1250;
Fuenn, Keneset Yisrael, pp. 575–576.

1661 births
1733 deaths
17th-century Austrian rabbis
Austrian Orthodox rabbis
Rabbis from Prague
17th-century Bohemian rabbis
18th-century Polish–Lithuanian rabbis
Rabbis from Metz